There are 1,800 hospitals in Colombia.

75% of hospitals are public and the remaining 25% are private .

This is a list of hospitals for human medical treatment in Colombia.

Barranquilla

Bogotá

Bucaramanga 
Hospital Universitario de Santander HUS ESE
Hospital Universitario de Bucaramanga - Los Comuneros
Clinica Chicamocha
Centro de Cáncer Virgilio Galvis
Instituto del Corazón de Floridablanca(Fundación Cardiovascular de Colombia)
Fundación Oftalmológica de Santander - Clínica Carlos Ardila Lülle

Cali 
Clínica Fundación Valle de Lili
Hospital Universitario del Valle "Evaristo García"
Centro Médico Imbanaco
Clínica Nuestra Señora de los Remedios
Clínica Nuestra Señora del Rosario
Hospital Infantil Club Noel
Hospital Isaías Duarte Cancino
Hospital Departamental Mario Correa Rengifo
Hospital Carlos Holmes Trujillo
Hospital Joaquín Paz Borrero
Hospital Carlos Carmona
Clínica Tequendama (Comfandi)
Hospital San Juan de Dios
Clínica Santillana
Clínica Materno Infantil los Farallones
Clínica Versalles
Clínica Santiago de Cali
Clínica Rafael Uribe Uribe (Universidad Libre-Comfenalco)
Clínica San Fernando
Clínica Oriente
Clínica DIME Neurocardiovascular
Clínica de Occidente
Clínica Sebastián de Belalcázar (Colsanitas)
Clínica SaludCoop
Clínica Comfenalco
Clínica Amiga (Comfandi)
Clínica de Oftalmología de Cali S.A.
Hospital Departamental Psiquiátrico Universitario del Valle

Cartagena 
 
 Hospital Infantil Napoleón Franco Pareja
 Hospital Universitario del Caribe
 FIRE Fundación Centro Colombiano De Epilepsia
 Hospital Naval
 Clínica Maternidad Rafael Calvo

Chía 
Clínica Universidad de la Sabana

Cúcuta 
 Hospital Erasmo Meoz
 Clínica San José
 PoliClínico Juan Atalaya
 Clínica De Leones
 Clínica Saludcoop Cúcuta
 Corporación Socorro Médico Santa Fe Ltda
 Clínica Del Norte

Ibagué 
Clínica Minerva
Clínica Tolima
Hospital Federico Lleras Acosta ESE
Hospital San Francisco ESE
Instituto del Corazón de Ibagué (FCV)

Manizales 
 Clinica Manizales
 Instituto del Corazón de Manizales (FCV)
 Clinica de la Presentacion
 Hospital Santa Sofia
 Hospital de Caldas
 Hospital Infantil (hospital)

Medellín

Neiva

Santa Marta 
Instituto del Corazón de Santa Marta (FCV)

Tuluá 
Hospital Departamental Tomás Uribe Uribe
Clínica San Francisco S.A.
Clínica Médico-quirúrgica Alvernia Ltda.
Clínica Mariángel

References

 The 100 best Hospitals in Colombia
 Ministry of Health, Healthcare Provider Information System; Statistics on the Colombian healthcare sector.  Retrieved 10/01/14.
 Ministry of Health, Ministry of Health.  Retrieved 10/01/14.
 Global Health Intelligence, Information on Healthcare in emerging markets.  Retrieved 10/01/14.

Lists of buildings and structures in Colombia
Colombia
List
Colombia